Callophrys johnsoni, the Johnson's hairstreak, is a butterfly of the family Lycaenidae. It is found in North America from British Columbia south to central California. The habitat consists of coniferous forests.

The wingspan is 25–30 mm. Adults are on wing from May to July in one generation per year.

The larvae feed on pine dwarf mistletoe (Arceuthobium campylopodum).

References

External links
 Callophrys johnsoni, Butterflies and Moths of North America

Butterflies described in 1904
Callophrys